Kerry Spackman (born 26 June 1956 in Auckland, New Zealand) is a cognitive neuroscientist and Winner of the 2010 World Class New Zealand Award for Creative Thinking, and the 1992 NEEDA Award for the most Significant Electronic Export. 
He coaches athletes, business people, and other personalities to succeed within their chosen fields. He has been a consultant to four Formula One teams as well as the New Zealand All Blacks specialising in performance optimisation and he is a director of the New Zealand Government GoldMine program which develops specialized electronics and mathematical analysis for Olympic athletes.

Life and career 
Spackman was born to father Dr Dennis Spackman, a medical practitioner and mother Rowan, whose father was Sir Trevor Henry a High Court Judge in New Zealand. Spackman spent much of his childhood in Auckland. He was educated at Auckland Grammar School before training as a mathematician at the University of Waikato and Auckland.

Early in his career, Spackman worked with a New Zealand-based Physicist to develop electronic equipment to measure the performance of cars. The pair then sold these programmes on to automotive companies including Rolls-Royce, Nissan, General Motors and Ford. During this period Spackman met the three times World Formula One Champion Sir Jackie Stewart with whom he later worked to develop a program to train professional test drivers. Spackman continued to work with Jackie Stewart at Stewart Grand Prix and Jaguar for a number of years.

In Formula One, Spackman is recognised as making contributions in areas ranging from simulator design to driver optimisation.

Spackman currently divides his time between New Zealand and the United States and is a father and grandfather.

Books and television
The Winners Bible: Rewire Your Brain For Permanent Change (2009) (Greenleaf Book Group)
The Ant and the Ferrari (2012) (Harper Collins)
 In television Spackman has written and presented a showcase 1 hour documentary for the Discovery Channel about his work in Formula One called "Speed Science".

References

External links 
Kerry Spackman official site
The Ant and the Ferrari (book site)

1956 births
People educated at Auckland Grammar School
Living people
University of Waikato alumni